The Federal Department of Environment, Transport, Energy and Communications (DETEC) is one of the seven departments of the Swiss federal government, headed by a member of the Swiss Federal Council.

Organisation
The department is composed of the following offices:

 General Secretariat
 Federal Office for Spatial Development (ARE): Coordinates area planning between the federal agencies, the cantons and the municipalities.
 Federal Office for the Environment (FOEN): Responsible for matters of the environment, including  the protection of plants and animals and the protection against noise, air pollution or natural hazards.
 Federal Office for Civil Aviation (FOCA): Regulates civil aviation.
 Federal Office of Communications (OFCOM): Regulates radio and TV stations, notably the Swiss Broadcasting Corporation.
 Federal Office of Energy (FOE): Responsible for the provision of electrical energy at the federal level, as well as for the supervision of dams.
 Federal Office of Transport (FOT): Responsible for public transport at the federal level, including the development of the federal rail network and navigation on the Rhine.
 Federal Roads Authority (FEDRO): Responsible for the construction, maintenance and operation of the national highway network.

The following independent authorities are affiliated to the DETEC for administrative purposes:
 Swiss Transportation Safety Investigation Board (formerly Aircraft Accident Investigation Bureau and Investigation Bureau for Railway, Funicular and Boat Accidents).
 Federal Communications Commission (ComCom): Regulates the telecommunications market, awards service licences, rules on interconnection disputes and approves frequency and numbering plans.
 Federal Inspectorate for Heavy Current Installations (ESTI): Responsible for inspecting low and heavy-current electrical installations.
 Federal Nuclear Safety Inspectorate (HSK): Assesses and monitors security and radiation protection in Swiss nuclear installations.
 Federal Pipelines Inspectorate (ERI): Responsible for the planning, construction and operation of fuel pipeline systems in Switzerland and Liechtenstein.
 Independent Complaints Authority for Radio and Television: Decides on complaints about radio and television  programmes.
 PostReg: Regulates the Swiss Post.
 Railways Arbitration Commission (RACO): Arbitrates in disputes over access to the rail network.

Name of department
1848–1859: Department of Posts and Construction
1860–1872: Department of Posts
1873–1878: Department of Posts and Telegraph
1879–1962: Department of Posts and Railways
1963–1978: Department of Transport, Communications and Energy
1979–1997: Federal Department of Transport, Communications and Energy
Since 1998: Federal Department of Environment, Transport, Energy and Communications

List of heads of the department

See also 
 Energy in Switzerland

Notes and references

External links
 Official website

 
Environment, Transport, Energy and Communications
Communications in Switzerland
Transport in Switzerland
Energy in Switzerland